E-Boy is a 2012 Philippine fantasy science fiction television drama series directed by FM Reyes and Nick Olanka. The series stars Bugoy Cariño in the title role, with an ensemble cast consisting of Andrea Brillantes, Ariel Rivera, Agot Isidro, Jomari Yllana, Maliksi Morales, Deydey Amansec, Arjo Atayde, Akiko Solon, Bryan Santos, Jaime Fabregas, Pen Medina, Chinggoy Alonzo, and Carme Sanchez, with Valerie Concepcion, Crispin Pineda, Tommy Abuel, Gerald Pesigan, Izzy Canillo, Barbie Sabino, Phytos Kyriacou, and Paolo Serrano in their supporting roles. The series premiered on ABS-CBN's Primetime Bida nighttime block from January 30 to April 13, 2012, replacing Ikaw ay Pag-Ibig.

Series overview

Episodes

2012

References

E-Boy
2010s television-related lists